Central Point Software, Inc. (CP, CPS, Central Point) was a leading software utilities maker for the PC market, supplying utilities software for the DOS and Microsoft Windows markets. It also made Apple II copy programs.  Through a series of mergers, the company was ultimately acquired by Symantec in 1994.

History
CPS was founded by Michael Burmeister-Brown (Mike Brown) in 1980 in Central Point, Oregon, for which the company was named. Building on the success of its Copy II PC backup utility, it moved to Beaverton, Oregon. In 1993 CPS acquired the XTree Company. It was itself acquired by Symantec in 1994, for around $60 million.

Products
The company's most important early product was a series of utilities which allowed exact duplicates to be made of copy-protected diskettes.  The first version, Copy II Plus v1.0 (for the Apple II), was released in June 1981. With the success of the IBM PC and compatibles, a version for that platform - Copy II PC (copy2pc) - was released in 1983.

CPS also offered a hardware add-in expansion card, the Copy II PC Deluxe Board, which was bundled with its own software. The Copy II PC Deluxe Board was able to read, write and copy disks from Apple II and Macintosh computer systems as well. COPY II PC's main competitor was Quaid Software's CopyWrite, which did not have a hardware component.

CPS also released Option Board hardware with TransCopy software for duplicating copy-protected floppy diskettes.

In 1985 CPS released PC Tools, an integrated graphical DOS shell and utilities package. PC Tools was an instant success and became Central Point's flagship product, and positioned the company as the major competitor to Peter Norton Computing and its Norton Utilities and Norton Commander. CPS later manufactured a Macintosh version called Mac Tools. CPS licensed the Mirror, Undelete, and Unformat components of PC Tools to Microsoft for inclusion in MS-DOS versions 5.x and 6.x as external DOS utilities. CPS File Manager was ahead of its time, with features such as view ZIP archives as directories and a file/picture viewer.

In 1993 CPS released PC Tools for Windows 2.0 which ran on Windows 3.1.  After the Symantec acquisition the programmer group that created PCTW 2.0 created Norton Navigator for Windows 95 and Symantec unbundled the File Manager used in PCTW 2.0 and released it as PC-Tools File Manager 3.0 for Windows 3.1

The lateness of PCTW to the Windows market was a major factor in why CPS was acquired by Symantec. Windows Server at the time was not viewed as a credible alternative to Novell NetWare - the first version of Windows Server was released in 1993 - and the desktop and server software products market was completely centered on Novell NetWare.  The subsequent stumble by Novell to maintain dominance in the server market came years later and had nothing to do with the acquisition.  Instead, like many software vendors, CPS underestimated how rapidly users were going to shift to Windows from DOS.

CPS's other major desktop product was Central Point Anti-Virus (CPAV), whose main competitor was Norton Antivirus. CPAV was a licensed version of Carmel Software'''s Turbo Anti-Virus; CPS, in turn, licensed CPAV to Microsoft to create Microsoft Antivirus for DOS (MSAV) and Windows (MWAV).

CPS also released CPAV for Netware 3.xx and 4.x Netware servers in 1993.

Central Point also sold the Apple II clone Laser 128 by mail.

List of CPS products

 PC Tools PC Tools for Windows Central Point Anti-Virus Central Point Anti-Virus for NetWare Central Point Backup Central Point Desktop Central Point Commute Copy II+ Copy II 64 (for Commodore 64/128)
 Copy II PC Copy II Mac Copy II ST (for Atari ST/TT series computers)
 MacTools and MacTools Pro More PC Tools LANlord Deluxe Option Board''

See also
List of mergers and acquisitions by Symantec

References

Defunct software companies of the United States
Defunct companies based in Oregon
Software companies established in 1980
Software companies disestablished in 1994
Gen Digital acquisitions
Central Point, Oregon
1980 establishments in Oregon
1994 disestablishments in Oregon